City Stadium is a football stadium in Gusinje in Montenegro, and is the home ground of FK Gusinje.

History
The stadium was built from 1994 to 1996, as a part of a Sports center, following the promotion of FK Gusinje to the Montenegrin Republic League. Stadium has one stand with 2,000 seats.

References

Football venues in Montenegro
1996 establishments in Montenegro
Sports venues completed in 1996